The 1938 New York Yankees season was their 36th season. The team finished with a record of 99–53, winning their 10th pennant, finishing 9.5 games ahead of the Boston Red Sox. New York was managed by Joe McCarthy. The Yankees played their home games at Yankee Stadium. In the 1938 World Series, they beat the Chicago Cubs in 4 games. This marked the first time any team had won three consecutive World Series.

Offseason
 Prior to 1938 season: Milo Candini was acquired by the Yankees from the El Paso Texans.

Regular season

Season standings

Record vs. opponents

Roster

Player stats

Batting

Starters by position
Note: Pos = Position; G = Games played; AB = At bats; H = Hits; Avg. = Batting average; HR = Home runs; RBI = Runs batted in

Other batters
Note: G = Games played; AB = At bats; H = Hits; Avg. = Batting average; HR = Home runs; RBI = Runs batted in

Pitching

Starting pitchers
Note: G = Games pitched; IP = Innings pitched; W = Wins; L = Losses; ERA = Earned run average; SO = Strikeouts

Other pitchers
Note: G = Games pitched; IP = Innings pitched; W = Wins; L = Losses; ERA = Earned run average; SO = Strikeouts

Relief pitchers
Note: G = Games pitched; W = Wins; L = Losses; SV = Saves; ERA = Earned run average; SO = Strikeouts

1938 World Series 

AL New York Yankees (4) vs. NL Chicago Cubs (0)

Farm system

LEAGUE CHAMPIONS: Kansas City, Newark, El Paso, Neosho, Bassett, Norfolk (NSL), Butler

Notes

References
1938 New York Yankees at Baseball Reference
1938 World Series
1938 New York Yankees team page at www.baseball-almanac.com

New York Yankees seasons
New York Yankees
New York Yankees
1930s in the Bronx
American League champion seasons
World Series champion seasons